Litvinovo is a rural locality (a settlement) in Kolchugino, Kolchuginsky District, Vladimir Oblast, Russia. The population was 118 as of 2010.

Geography 
Litvinovo is located between Peksha and Mezhonka Rivers, 5 km northeast of Kolchugino (the district's administrative centre) by road. Dmitriyevsky Pogost is the nearest rural locality.

References 

Rural localities in Kolchuginsky District